The 2019 Bianca Andreescu tennis season officially began on December 31, 2018 with the start of the 2019 WTA Tour. She entered the season as No. 152 in the world.

Year in detail

Early hard court season

Auckland Open
Andreescu started her season at the Auckland Open, where she qualified for the main draw after beating Kristína Kučová, Jaimee Fourlis and Laura Siegemund. In the main draw, she made it to the final after defeating four top-30 players, including two former World No. 1 players, Caroline Wozniacki and Venus Williams. However, she lost to defending champion Julia Görges in three sets.

Australian Open
In Melbourne, Andreescu successfully progressed through qualifying to enter the main draw. She then beat Whitney Osuigwe before losing in the second round to Anastasija Sevastova in three sets.

Newport Beach
Andreescu played at the Newport Beach, where she was the sixth seed. Having received a bye in the first round, she then won the next five matches and secured her first ever WTA 125K series title, which elevated herself to the World No. 68.

Mexican Open
In February, Andreescu played the Mexican Open, where she got to the semi-finals, losing to No. 5 seed Sofia Kenin in three sets. Nevertheless, her ranking climbed to a career-high 60.

March sunshine events

Indian Wells Open
This year's Indian Wells Premier Mandatory event proved to be her breakout event. By reaching the semi-finals, Andreescu became the third wild card to reach the semi-finals of the tournament, joining Grand Slam champions Serena Williams and Kim Clijsters. She then defeated two then top-ten players, Elina Svitolina and Angelique Kerber, to win her first WTA title. The victory also promoted the 19-year-old rising star to a new-career high ranking of 24.

Miami Open
Several days later, Andreescu drew Begu in the first round again in Miami. She managed to save a match point and eventually won the match to reach the second round. In the second round, she avenged her Acapulco loss to Kenin to set up another meeting with Kerber. She upset Kerber in three sets once again, but she had to retire against Anett Kontaveit due to a right shoulder injury, ending her 10-match winning streak.

European clay court season

French Open
After a three-month-long recovery, Andreescu returned to the tennis court at the French Open, as the 22nd seed. However, she retired before her second round match against Kenin. She missed the entire grass-court season to recover from her shoulder injury.

US Open series

Rogers Cup
Andreescu came back two months later in her home tournament, the 2019 Rogers Cup in Toronto, where she made to her third WTA final after defeating two former top-ten players, Eugenie Bouchard and Daria Kasatkina, and two then top-ten players, Kiki Bertens and Karolína Plíšková, all in three sets. In the semi-finals, she met Kenin for the third time this season, and successfully upset the American girl in two straight sets. Her final rival was the 23-time Grand Slam winner Serena Williams, but a tearful Williams retired when she was 1–3 down in the first set due to her own injury. This gave Bianca her second WTA title, and a career-high ranking of 14.

US Open
Two weeks later, she was seeded 15th in the US Open. She made it to the second week of a Grand Slam without losing a set. In the fourth round, she outlasted local player Taylor Townsend to make her first quarter-final appearance in a Grand Slam. After downing Elise Mertens in three tough sets, she upset Belinda Bencic in two sets to reach her first Grand Slam final, where she faced Serena Williams once again. Andreescu beat Serena in straight sets, becoming the first Canadian to win a Grand Slam singles title, the first woman to win the US Open in her main draw debut (she previously lost in a qualifying round), and the first player born after 2000 to win a Grand Slam tournament. With the 2,000 points she won from the Grand Slam, she made her top-five debut.

East Asian fall swing

China Open
Having rested for near a month, Andreescu returned to court in the China Open, the tournament she never played before. She upset Aliaksandra Sasnovich, Elise Mertens and Jennifer Brady to reach quarterfinals, where her opponent was the former World No. 1 players Naomi Osaka. She eventually lost to the Japanese woman after three tough sets, ending her 17-match winning streak. Nevertheless, Andreescu was still qualified for the WTA Finals for the first time in her career.

Year-end Championships

WTA Finals
At the Year-end Championships, Andreescu was divided into the purple group, alongside Karolína Plíšková, Simona Halep and defending champion Elina Svitolina. The first round robin match against Halep marked the first-ever meeting between the two Romanian descendants. Despite having a match point, she was still edged by the 2019 Wimbledon Champion in three tough sets. In the second match against World No. 2 Plíšková, Andreescu retired after losing the opening set when she injured her knee. The injury ended her season a little bit earlier than expected as she withdrew from the tournament. Sofia Kenin later replaced her to complete the match against Svitolina.

All matches

Singles matches

Doubles matches

Tournament schedule

Singles schedule
Andreescu's 2019 singles tournament schedule is as follows:

Doubles schedule
Andreescu's 2019 doubles tournament schedule is as follows:

Yearly records

Top 10 wins

Finals
Singles: 4 (3 titles, 1 runner-up)

Earnings

See also

 2019 WTA Tour
 2019 Simona Halep tennis season
 Bianca Andreescu career statistics

References

External links
 
 
 

2019 in Canadian sports
2019 tennis player seasons
2019 in Canadian tennis